Golam Sarwar Tipu (born 22 October 1945), is a former Bangladeshi football player and manager. He is one of the few East Pakistani footballers to represent the Pakistan national football team.

Club career
While studying in Tejgaon school, Tipu was introduced to neighbourhood club Tejgaon Friends Union, which he joined in 1963, after compelting his Matriculation examination the previous year. With the club he took part in the Dhaka Second Division. In 1964, he was signed up by Ex-Pakistani international Chunna Rashid's EPG Press, with them he palyed in  the Dhaka League without remuneration, before Rashid fixed his move to Wari Club the following year. 

Tipu had his breathrough season with Wari Club in 1965,  and after a year at Rahmatganj MFS, he was snapped up by Makrani dominated Victoria SC the following year. In 1968, Tipu got his move to Pakistan's strongest team, Mohammedan SC, after impressing the clubs official  Amir Jang Ghaznabi. Tipu made his Mohammedan debut against his former club Rahmatganj MFS, replacing Pakistani forward Moosa. In his debut season he won the Aga Khan Gold Cup, and in the final against Ceylon, he scored a brace in a 5–1 win. With The Black and Whites, he won his first league title in 1969, establishing a lethal partnership with Pakistani striker Ali Nawaz.

In 1972, almost a year after Bangladesh Liberation War, Tipu joined the newly established Abahani Krira Chakra, after being persuaded by Sheikh Kamal. Although he suffered a serious knee injury the previous year, he was made the clubs captain in 1973. The following year, although not in his best form, he won league title with Abahani. In 1975, Tipu returned to Mohammedan, and became hat trick champions, winning the league title in 1975, 1976 and 1978. He announced his retirement after playing against Kolkata Mohammedan in a charity match, and during the match he got an assist for Sheikh Mohammad Aslam's goal, as the game ended 1–1.

International career
In 1967, he trialed for the Pakistan national football team while still at Victoria SC, and after getting his move to Mohammedan SC, he made his official debut for Pakistan after during the 1969 Friendship Cup, held in Tehran, Iran. He is one of the few East Pakistani players to get a chance in the Pakistan national team which was dominated by West Pakistan. During the tournament, Tipu played against Soviet club Spartak Moscow.

In September of that year, Tipu was part of the Pakistan team which played against both Turkey and Iran at the 1969 RCD Cup, held in Ankara, Turkey. His career playing for Pakistan also ended after that tournament, as he did not trial for the team in 1970, due to his studies.

On 13 February, during the first in idependent Bangladesh, which was between President XI and Bangladesh XI, Tipu was the vice-captain of the President XI and scored the first goal of the match, which ended in his team winning 2–0 (Scooter Abdul Gafoor scored the second goal). On 11 May 1972, Tipu's Mohammedan SC took on Mohun Bagan AC, who were the first foreign team to visit Bangladesh after independence. Although Tipu was on the losing side at the end of the game, two days later on 13 May, Tipu defeated the Indian side as a member of the Dhaka XI, with Kazi Salahuddin scoring the only goal.

Later on that year, Tipu played for the Dhaka XI at India's Bordoloi Trophy, and scored in the final against East Bengal Club, as his team finished runner-up. However, a knee injury he suffered in 1972, prevented him a place in the first Bangladesh national football team,  which played in Malaysia's Merdeka Tournament, in 1973. After returning from injury, Tipu could not regain his old form, and retired in 1979, without getting a chance to play for Bangladesh.

Coaching career
In 1980, a year after his retirement from plaing, Tipu took charge of Mohammedan SC. With them he won the league title in 1980 and 1982. During his debut year as coach, Tipu also got an opportunity to train in England. He managed the Bangladesh U20 at the qualfying round of the 1985 AFC Youth Championship, eventually failing to guide the team to the main tournament. The same year he managed the senior national team at the 1984 AFC Asian Cup qualifiers in Jakarta, Indonesia. His first win as the national team coach came against Philippines, during the qualifiers. In 1986, he was incharge of the national team again, this time during the 1986 Asian Games, in Seoul, South Korea, and the only game Bangladesh won during the tournament came against Nepal.

Tipu returned to domestic football, coaching both Arambagh KS and Agrani Bank Ltd, until in 1987, he joined Muktijoddha SKC. Tipu won the "Freedom Fighters" their first Dhaka Premier Division League title during the 1997–98 season. He managed the Bangladesh U16 team at the 1998 AFC U-16 Championship, and during the tournament his side earned a hard fought 2–2 draw with Japan U16. His last coaching job with the national team came during the 2006 FIFA World Cup qualification – AFC First Round, where Bangladesh lost 4–0 to Tajikistan on aggregate. During the 2009–10 Bangladesh League, Tipu guided a financially struggling Muktijoddha SKC to a sixth place finish.

After retirement
Following his retirement from football as a coach and player, Tipu regularly appears as a football pundit for various news outlets.

Honours

Player

Mohammedan SC
Dhaka League = 1969, 1975, 1976, 1978
Aga Khan Gold Cup = 1968
Independence Cup = 1972

Abahani Krira Chakra
Dhaka League =1974

Manager

Mohammedan SC
Dhaka League = 1980, 1982
Federation Cup = 1980*, 1981, 1982*, 1983
 Ashis-Jabbar Shield Tournament = 1982

Muktijoddha SKC
Dhaka Premier Division League = 1997–98

Awards and accolades
1979 − National Sports Awards.
2013 − National Sports Awards (Lifetime honour).

References

External links 
 

 
Living people
1945 births
Association football wingers
Bangladeshi footballers
Pakistan international footballers
Rahmatganj MFS players
Mohammedan SC (Dhaka) players
Abahani Limited (Dhaka) players
Bangladeshi football managers
Bangladesh national football team managers
People from Barisal
Recipients of the Bangladesh National Sports Award